The 2021–22 Pac-12 Conference men's basketball season began with practices starting in October, followed by the 2021–22 NCAA Division I men's basketball season which started on November 9. Conference play began on November 28. This is the tenth season under the Pac–12 Conference name and the 62nd since the conference was established under its current charter as the Athletic Association of Western Universities in 1959. Including the history of the Pacific Coast Conference, which operated from 1915 to 1959 and is considered by the Pac-12 as a part of its own history, this is the Pac-12's 106th season of basketball.

The Pac-12 tournament is scheduled for March 9–12, 2022 at the T-Mobile Arena in Paradise, Nevada.

Pre-season

Recruiting classes

Preseason watchlists
Below is a table of notable preseason watch lists.

Preseason All-American teams

Preseason polls

Pac-12 Media days
The Pac-12 will conduct its 2021 Pac-12 media days at the Pac-12 Studio, in San Francisco, California, on October 13, 2021 (Pac-12 Network).

The teams and representatives in respective order were as follows:

 Pac-12 Commissioner – George Kliavkoff
 Deputy Commissioner and Chief Operating Officer(MBB) – Jamie Zaninovich
 Arizona – Tommy Lloyd (HC), Bennedict Mathurin  (G/F), Ąžuolas Tubelis (PF)
 Arizona State – Bobby Hurley (HC), Marcus Bagley (SF), Kimani Lawrence (PF)
 California – Mark Fox (HC),  Grant Anticevich (PF), Andre Kelly (SF)
 Colorado – Tad Boyle (HC), Evan Battey (PF), Elijah Parquet (SG)
 Oregon – Dana Altman (HC), Will Richardson (PG), Eric Williams Jr. (SG)
 Oregon State – Wayne Tinkle (HC), Warith Alatishe (SF), Jarod Lucas (PG)
 Stanford – Jerod Haase (HC), Jaiden Delaire (SF), Spencer Jones (SF)
 UCLA – Mick Cronin (HC), Jaime Jaquez Jr. (SF), Johnny Juzang (SG)
 USC – Andy Enfield (HC), Isaiah Mobley (PF), Drew Peterson (SG)
 Utah – Craig Smith (HC), Riley Battin (PF), Branden Carlson (C)
 Washington – Mike Hopkins (HC), Jamal Bey (SG), Nate Roberts (PF)
 Washington State – Kyle Smith (HC), Efe Abogidi (PF), Tyrell Roberts (PG)

Source:

Pac-12 Preseason All-Conference

First Team

Second Team

Honorable Mention
Efe Abogidi (So., WSU); Daejon Davis (Gr., WASH); Jaiden Delaire (Sr., STAN); Harrison Ingram (Fr., STAN); Jabari Walker (So., COLO); Peyton Watson (Fr., UCLA).

Midseason watchlists
Below is a table of notable midseason watch lists.

Final watchlists
Below is a table of notable year end watch lists.

Regular season
The Schedule will be released in late October. Before the season, it was announced that for the seventh consecutive season, all regular season conference games and conference tournament games would be broadcast nationally by CBS Sports, FOX Sports, ESPN Inc. family of networks including ESPN, ESPN2 and ESPNU, and the Pac-12 Network.

Early season tournaments

Records against other conferences
2021–22 records against non-conference opponents through the 2022 Season:

Regular Season

Postseason

Record against ranked non-conference opponents
This is a list of games against ranked opponents only (rankings from the AP Poll):

Team rankings are reflective of AP poll when the game was played, not current or final ranking

† denotes game was played on neutral site

Conference schedule
This table summarizes the head-to-head results between teams in conference play.

Points scored

Through 2022 Season

Rankings

^AP poll is not released for the Final Week.

Head coaches

Coaching changes
On March 16, 2021, Utah fired Larry Krystkowiak as head coach after 10 seasons.  Utah hired former Utah State coach Craig Smith in March 27, 2021.

On April 7, 2021, Arizona fired Sean Miller as head coach after 12 seasons.  April 15, Arizona announced it hired long time Gonzaga assistant coach Tommy Lloyd.

Coaches
Note: Stats shown are before the beginning of the season. Overall and Pac-12 records are from time at current school.

Notes:
 Overall and Pac-12 records, conference titles, etc. are from time at current school and are through the end the 2020–21 season.
 NCAA tournament appearances are from time at current school only.
 NCAA Final Fours and Championship include time at other schools
 Conference titles refer to amount of tournament titles each coach has and not regular season titles.

Post season

Pac-12 tournament

The conference tournament is scheduled to be played from March 9–12, 2022, at the T-Mobile Arena, Paradise, NV. The top four teams had a bye on the first day. Teams were seeded by conference record, with ties broken by record between the tied teams followed by record against the regular-season champion, if necessary.

NCAA tournament

Three teams from the conference were selected to participate: Arizona, UCLA, and USC

National Invitation Tournament 
Three teams from the conference were selected to participate: Colorado, Oregon, and Washington State.

Awards and honors

Players of the Week 
Throughout the conference regular season, the Pac-12 offices named one or two players of the week each Monday.

Totals per School

National honors

All-Americans

Bennedict Mathurin, Arizona, Consensus Second team (Associated Press, National Association of Basketball Coaches,  Sporting News, United States Basketball Writers Association)
Johnny Juzang, UCLA, Third team (National Association of Basketball Coaches)

Coach of the year
Tommy Lloyd, Arizona (AP Coach of the Year, NABC Coach of the Year, USBWA Coach of the Year)

All-District
The United States Basketball Writers Association (USBWA) named the following from the Pac-12 to their All-District Teams:

District VIII
All-District Team
Jabari Walker, Colorado

District IX
Coach of the Year

Tommy Lloyd, Arizona

All-District Team
Terrell Brown Jr., Washington
Johnny Juzang, UCLA
Christian Koloko, Arizona
Bennedict Mathurin, Arizona
Isaiah Mobley, USC
Will Richardson, Oregon
Ąžuolas Tubelis, Arizona

The National Association of Basketball Coaches (NABC) named the following from the Pac-12 to their All-District Teams:

District 19
Coach of the Year

Tommy Lloyd, Arizona

All-District First Team
 Johnny Juzang – UCLA
 Bennedict Mathurin – Arizona
 Isaiah Mobley – USC
 Will Richardson – Oregon
 Ąžuolas Tubelis – Arizona

All-District Second Team
 Terrell Brown Jr. – Washington
 Tyger Campbell – UCLA
 Jaime Jaquez Jr. – UCLA
 Christian Koloko – Arizona
 Jabari Walker – Colorado

Conference awards
Voting was by conference coaches.

Individual awards

All-Pac-12

First Team

 ‡ Pac-12 Player of the Year
 ††† three-time All-Pac-12 First Team honoree
 †† two-time All-Pac-12 First Team honoree
 † two-time All-Pac-12 honoree

Second Team

Honorable Mention
 Boogie Ellis, (USC, PG)
 Harrison Ingram, (STAN, SF)
 Spencer Jones, (STAN, SF)
 Andre Kelly, (Cal, PF)
 Jordan Shepherd, (CAL, SG)
 Dalen Terry, (ARIZ, SG)

All-Freshman Team

† Pac-12 Player of the Year
‡ Pac-12 Freshman of the Year
Honorable Mention
Sam Alajiki, CAL
Peyton Watson, UCLA

All-Defensive Team

† Pac-12 Player of the Year
‡ Pac-12 Defensive Player of the Year
†† two-time Pac-12 All-Defensive Team honoree
Honorable Mention
 Efe Abogidi, (WSU, C)
 Evan Battey, (COLO, PF)
 Marreon Jackson, (ASU, SG)
 Spencer Jones, (STAN, SF)
 Franck Kepnang, (ORE, C)
 Isaiah Mobley, (USC, PF)

Scholar Athlete of the year
The Pac-12 moved to seasonal Academic Honor Rolls, discontinuing sport-by-sport teams, starting in 2019-20

Source:

2022 NBA draft

Home game attendance 

Bold – At or exceed capacity
†Season high

References